Obinna Nwafor  (born November 16, 1965) popularly known as Saint Obi, is a Nigerian actor, film producer and film director. Saint Obi is known for his roles in Candle Light, Sakobi, Goodbye Tomorrow, Heart of Gold, Festival of Fire, Executive Crime and Last Party.

He major in theatre arts at the University of Jos. Saint Obi came into the acting scene in 1996, after doing a commercial for Peugeot on NTA. He has starred in over 60 movies. In 2001, Saint Obi produced his first movie titled Take Me to Maama, where he starred as Jerry, alongside Ebi Sam, Rachel Oniga, Nse Abel and Enebeli Elebuwa.

See also
 List of Nigerian film producers

References

External links

Nigerian male film actors
Nigerian film directors
Nigerian film producers
Living people
Male actors from Port Harcourt
21st-century Nigerian male actors
University of Jos alumni
1965 births
20th-century Nigerian male actors
Igbo actors
20th-century births